The 2022 United States House of Representatives elections in Utah were held on November 8, 2022, to elect the four U.S. representatives from the state of Utah, one from each of the state's four congressional districts. The elections coincided with other elections to the House of Representatives, elections to the United States Senate and various state and local elections.

Overview

District 1

The 1st district is located in northern Utah, including the cities of Ogden, Logan, Park City, Layton, Clearfield, and the northern half of the Great Salt Lake. The incumbent is Republican Blake Moore, who was elected with 69.5% of the vote in 2020.

Republican primary

Candidates

Nominee
Blake Moore, incumbent U.S. Representative

Eliminated in primary
Andrew Badger, marketing director
Tina Cannon, former Morgan County councilwoman and candidate for Utah's 1st congressional district in 2020

Eliminated at convention
Bill Campbell, businessman, accountant and activist
Julie Fullmer, mayor of Vineyard

Endorsements

Convention results

Polling

Primary results

Democratic primary

Candidates

Nominee
Rick Jones, nominee for state representative in 2018

General election

Predictions

Polling

Results

District 2

The 2nd district encompasses both Salt Lake City and the rural western and southern parts of the state. The incumbent is Republican Chris Stewart, who was re-elected with 59.0% of the vote in 2020.

Republican primary

Candidates

Nominee
Chris Stewart, incumbent U.S. Representative

Eliminated in primary
Erin Rider, attorney and former congressional staffer for Orrin Hatch

Endorsements

Convention results

Primary results

Democratic primary

Candidates

Nominee
Nicholas Mitchell, scientist and business owner

Eliminated at convention
Steve Hartwick, nominee for state senate in 2016

Convention results

United Utah Party

Candidates

Declared
Jay McFarland, radio personality and Republican candidate for Utah's 4th congressional district in 2020

General election

Predictions

Polling

Results

District 3

The 3rd district includes rural southeastern Utah, stretches into the Provo-Orem metro area, and takes in the southeastern Salt Lake City suburbs of Holladay, Cottonwood Heights, Sandy, and Draper. The incumbent is Republican John Curtis, who was re-elected with 68.8% of the vote in 2020.

Republican primary

Candidates

Nominee
John Curtis, incumbent U.S. Representative

Eliminated in primary
Chris Herrod, former state representative and candidate for this district in 2017 and 2018

Eliminated at convention
Tim Aalders, perennial candidate
Lyman Wight
Jason Preston, businessman

Endorsements

Convention results

Polling

Primary results

Democratic primary

Candidates

Nominee
Glenn Wright, Summit County councilman

Eliminated at convention
Archie Williams III, perennial candidate

Endorsements

Convention results

Libertarian convention

Candidates

Nominee
 Michael Stoddard, financial planner

Constitution Party

Candidates

Nominee
 Daniel Clyde Cummings, perennial candidate

Independent American Party

Candidates

Nominee
 Aaron Heineman, perennial candidate

General election

Predictions

Polling

Results

District 4

The 4th district is based in southwest Salt Lake County, taking in parts of West Valley City and Salt Lake City, as well as South Salt Lake, Taylorsville, Murray, West Jordan, Midvale, South Jordan, Riverton, Herriman, and Bluffdale. The district also stretches south into eastern Utah County, western Juab County, and northern Sanpete County. The incumbent is Republican Burgess Owens, who flipped the district and was elected with 47.7% of the vote in 2020.

Republican primary

Candidates

Nominee
Burgess Owens, incumbent U.S. Representative

Eliminated in primary
Jake Hunsaker, technology executive and ex-financial analyst

Withdrew
Nick Huey, creative consultant and climate change activist

Endorsements

Convention results

Primary results

Democratic primary

Candidates

Nominee
Darlene McDonald, activist and candidate for this seat in 2018

United Utah Party

Candidates

Nominee
January Walker, businesswoman and cybersecurity professional

General election

Predictions

Polling

Results

Notes

References

External links
Official campaign websites for 1st district candidates
Rick Jones (D) for Congress
Blake Moore (R) for Congress

Official campaign websites for 2nd district candidates
Chris Stewart (R) for Congress
Jay McFarland (UU) for Congress
Nick Mitchell (D) for Congress

Official campaign websites for 3rd district candidates
John Curtis (R) for Congress
Glenn Wright (D) for Congress

Official campaign websites for 4th district candidates
Burgess Owens (R) for Congress
Darlene McDonald (D) for Congress
January Walker (UU) for Congress

2022
Utah
United States House of Representatives